The DS30B rapid-fire cannon is a 30mm Oerlikon stabilized, ship-protection system created by MSI-Defence Systems and controlled by a single operator.

Description 

The DS30B system consists of a marinized, stabilized gun mount which accommodates the Oerlikon KCB 30mm cannon. The DS30B is the predecessor to the 30mm DS30M Mark 2 Automated Small Calibre Gun, which mounts a 30mm Mark 44 Bushmaster II.

Operators 

 Used by the Royal Australian Navy to equip Huon-class minehunters

 Used by the Indonesian Navy to equip Bung Tomo-class corvettes

 Used by the Lithuanian Naval Force to equip the LNS Skalvis and LNS Kuršis minehunters.

 Used by Royal Malaysian Navy to equip the following ships:
 Lekiu-class frigate
 Kasturi-class corvette
 Gagah Samudera-class training ship

 The Royal Navy uses the system to equip the following ships:
 Type 45 destroyer
 River-class offshore patrol vessel
 Fort II-class auxiliary oiler and replenishment
 Sandown-class minehunter
 Hunt-class minehunter
 Archer-class fast patrol boat ("for but not with")
 Wave-class tanker
 Bay-class landing ship dock
 RFA Argus

References 

30 mm artillery
Naval guns of the United Kingdom
Naval guns of the United States
Naval anti-aircraft guns
Anti-aircraft guns of the Cold War

Autocannon